Bimalendu Mukherjee (2 January 1925 - 22 January 2010)  was an Indian classical sitar player and music teacher.

Mukherjee is a learned and eclectic musician – although he was an Imdadkhani sitar student of Enayat Khan, a full list of his teachers also includes sitarist Balaram Pathak, khyal singers Badri Prasad and Jaichand Bhatt of the Patiala and Kirana gharanas, Rampur gharana beenkar Jyotish Chandra Chowdhury, sarangi and esraj players Halkeram Bhat (Maihar gharana) and Chandrikaprasad Dube (Gaya gharana) and pakhavaj player Madhavrao Alkutkar. He also studied with Birendra Kishore Roy Chowdhury, the zamindar of Gouripur in present-day Bangladesh, who taught him the moribund sursringar (bass sarod).

Mukherjee is the father and teacher of sitar player Budhaditya Mukherjee. His other students include Shri Sudhakar Sheolikar, Shri Avneendra Sheolikar, Sanjoy Bandopadhyay, Sudhir, Anupama Bhagwat, Rajeev Janardan, and Kamala Shankar.

References

External links
Bimalendu Mukherjee bio by Anupama Bhagwat

1925 births
2010 deaths
Sitar players
Hindustani instrumentalists
Indian male classical musicians
Bengali musicians
Etawah gharana